Nicoma Park is a city in Oklahoma County, Oklahoma, United States, and a part of the Oklahoma City metropolitan area. The name Nicoma is a portmanteau of the first three letters of Nichols, for G.A. Nichols, and the last three letters of Oklahoma. The population was 2,393 at the 2010 census.

Geography
Nicoma Park is located at  (35.491411, -97.328519).

Demographics

As of the census of 2000, there were 2,415 people, 943 households, and 691 families residing in the city. The population density was 738.8 people per square mile (285.1/km). There were 1,089 housing units at an average density of 333.1 per square mile (128.6/km). The racial makeup of the city was 85.96% White, 3.40% African American, 4.43% Native American, 0.46% Asian, 0.87% from other races, and 4.89% from two or more races. Hispanic or Latino of any race were 3.56% of the population.

There were 941 households, out of which 30.2% had children under the age of 18 living with them, 57.3% were married couples living together, 11.6% had a female householder with no husband present, and 26.7% were non-families. 23.1% of all households were made up of individuals, and 9.8% had someone living alone who was 65 years of age or older. The average household size was 2.56 and the average family size was 3.02.

In the city, the population was spread out, with 25.5% under the age of 18, 7.4% from 18 to 24, 27.0% from 25 to 44, 23.5% from 45 to 64, and 16.6% who were 65 years of age or older. The median age was 38 years. For every 100 females, there were 100.9 males. For every 100 females age 18 and over, there were 95.0 males.

The median income for a household in the city was $36,190, and the median income for a family was $40,345. Males had a median income of $30,339 versus $20,417 for females. The per capita income for the city was $17,801. About 7.0% of families and 10.6% of the population were below the poverty line, including 14.3% of those under age 18 and 6.1% of those age 65 or over.

City government
Nicoma Park has a Mayor-Council form of government. The mayor is elected like other city officials but fulfills both the role of overseeing the city council meetings and running the day-to-day affairs of the city's administration. The city council consists of six ward council members.

References

Oklahoma City metropolitan area
Cities in Oklahoma County, Oklahoma
Cities in Oklahoma